The Eparchy of Marča was an Eastern Christian ecclesiastical entity taking two forms in the 17th century: an Eastern Orthodox eparchy and an Eastern Catholic vicariate. The term was derived from the name of the monastery at Marča (today Stara Marča) near Ivanić-Grad, Habsburg monarchy (present-day Zagreb County, Republic of Croatia).

Although Serbian Orthodox bishop Simeon Vratanja traveled to Rome in 1611 and formally accepted jurisdiction of the Pope over this bishopric, until 1670 Serb bishops continued to recognize the jurisdiction of the Serbian Patriarchate of Peć and struggled against conversion attempts by Roman Catholic bishops from Zagreb. This semi-union existed until the 1670 appointment of Pavle Zorčić as bishop. All Serb Orthodox clergy who objected to the union were arrested and sentenced to life in prison in Malta, where they died. The bishopric eventually became the Eastern Catholic Eparchy of Križevci.

Name
The name Marča was derived from the name of the nearby hill, Marča. Other names used for this bishopric include Svidnik (Svidnička eparhija), Vretanija (Vretanijska eparhija), and the "Uskok" bishopric.

History

Background
After the Ottoman capture of Smederevo fortress in 1459 and fall of Bosnia 1463 different populations of Orthodox Christians moved into Syrmia and by 1483 perhaps 200,000 Orthodox Christians moved into central Slavonia and Syrmia At the beginning of the 16th century settlements of Orthodox Christians were also established in western Croatia. In the first half of the 16th century Serbs settled Ottoman part of Slavonia while in the second part of the 16th century they moved to Austrian part of Slavonia. In 1550 they established the Lepavina Monastery. Orthodox Christians which settled Military Frontier from area of the Ottoman Empire were most often called Vlachs, while most documents state that the Vlachs coming "from Bosnia" or "from Turkey" ie from the Bosnian pashaluk, also they were of different ethnic origin and from 1611 under the Greek Catholic bishops of Marča. Mali Poganac and Veliki Poganac (village) are marked as Vlach settlements by name and signature, which is mentioned as a Vlach settlement in 1610, also in Lepavina (Lipavina) and the Marča Monastery. At the end of the 16th century a group of Serb Orthodox priests built a monastery dedicated to Saint Archangel Gabriel on the foundations (or near them) of the deserted and destroyed Catholic Monastery of All Saints.

Eparchy of Vretanija
Some scholars promoted the view that Marča, as a diocese of the Serbian Patriarchate of Peć, was established in the late 16th century (1578 or 1597). This theory was used as evidence of the long-time presence of the Serb population on the northern bank of river Sava.

In 1609 Serb Orthodox priests established Marča Monastery in Marča near Ivanić-Grad. In the same year the Marča Monastery became a seat of the Eparchy of Vretanija. This bishopric was the westernmost eparchy of the Serbian Patriarchate of Peć. Its name was derived from Vretanija which was a part of the title of the Serbian Patriarch. Its first bishop was Simeon Vratanja, appointed in 1609 by the Serbian Orthodox patriarch Jovan to the position of bishop of all Orthodox Serbs who settled to Croatia. This appointment marked establishment of the Eparchy of Vretanja in 1609 according to historian Aleksa Ivić.

Establishment as Eastern Catholic church
Being under strong pressure from Croatian clergy and state officials to recognize the jurisdiction of the Pope, and to convert the population of his bishopric to Eastern Catholicism, Simeon Vratanja visited Pope Paul V in 1611 and recognized his jurisdiction and maybe the Union of Florence as well. The strongest influence to his decision had Martin Dobrović, who convinced Simeon to recognize papal jurisdiction and to accept the Eastern Catholicism.
 
In November 1611, the Pope appointed Simeon as bishop of Serbs of Slavonia, Croatia and Hungary. He also granted all estates that once belonged to the Catholic Monastery of All Saints to the Marča Monastery. Pope Paul V granted to Bishop Simeon, Greek Catholic episcopal authority in Croatia, Hungary, Slavonia and Žumberak, which was also been confirmed by Archduke Ferdinand and Bishop of Zagreb Petar Petretić. From "Vlach" Bishop Simeon as he was called by authorities from Vienna it was expected to implement unification of Orthodox Vlachs with the Catholic Church in area of Croatian Military Frontier and Slavonian Military Frontier. On 21 November 1611 Marča was established as an eparchy (bishopric) of the Eastern Catholic Church, having around 60,000 believers.

Period of semi-union (1611–1670)
Simeon continued to use Slavic language, Julian calendar and maintained connection with Serbian Patriarchate of Peć.

In 1642 Benedikt Vinković wrote a letter to emperor Ferdinand III to write a report about "Vlachs" (Orthodox Serbs). Vinković's activities were aimed against Serb bishop of Marča, Maksim Predojević, whom he reported to the Sacred Congregation for the Propagation of the Faith when Predojević refused to support the conversion of the population of his bishopric to Catholicism. Vinković had intention to depose Predojević and appoint Rafael Levaković instead.

In 1648 the king appointed Sava Stanislavić as bishop of the Bishopric of Marča, as wished by the Slavonian Serbs, although Petar Petretić, bishop of the Roman Catholic Archdiocese of Zagreb proposed another candidate.

This kind of semi-union attitude of Serb bishops of the Bishopric of Marča remained until 1670 and appointment of Pavle Zorčić on the position of bishop. All priests of the Bishopric of Marča who objected to the union were arrested and imprisoned in Malta where they all died.

Period of union (1670–1753)

Until 19 November 1735, the Marča monastery was the seat of the Greek Catholic bishops
when the Orthodox Grenzers expelled the last three Greek Catholic monks. Following the verdict of Vienna authorities and decision that monastery belongs to the Greek Catholics, the Orthodox Grenzers burned Marča monastery on 28 June 1739.
In 1754 around 17,000 Serb Uskoks rebelled in support of the Marča monastery, the seat of Uskok bishopric. The monastery was abandoned, as ordered by Empress Maria Theresa, and its treasury was looted.

Bishops
The bishops of the Eparchy of Marča were:
 Simeon Vratanja (1607–1629)
 Maxim Predojević (1630–1642)
 Gabrijel Predojević (1642–1644)
 Vasilije Predojević (1644–1648)
 Sava Stanislavić (1648–1661)
 Gabrijel Mijakić (1663–1670)
 Pavao Zorčić (1671–1685)
 Marko Zorčić (1685–1688)
 Isaija Popović (1689–1699)
 Gabrijel Turčinović (1700–1707)
 Grgur Jugović (1707–1709)
 Rafael Marković (1710–1726)
 Georg Vučinić (1727–1733)
 Silvester Ivanović (1734–1735)
 Teofil Pašić (1738–1746)
 Gabrijel Palković (1751–1758)
 Vasilije Božičković (1759–1777)

References

Sources

Further reading 
 
 
 
 
 

History of the Serbian Orthodox Church in Croatia
Eastern Orthodox dioceses in Europe
Eastern Catholic dioceses in Europe
Greek Catholic Church of Croatia and Serbia
1611 establishments in Europe
1753 disestablishments